Thomas Howell Laby FRS (3 May 1880 – 21 June 1946), was an Australian physicist and chemist, Professor of Natural Philosophy, University of Melbourne 1915–1942.  Along with George Kaye, he was one of the founding editors of the reference book Tables of Physical and Chemical Constants and Some Mathematical Functions, usually known simply as "Kaye and Laby".

Early life
Born in Creswick, Victoria, Australia, Laby moved with his family to New South Wales around 1883. Laby's father, Thomas James Laby, a flour-miller, died in 1888. After some schooling at country schools and private study, Laby joined the Taxation Department in 1898 but soon gained a position in the chemical laboratory of the Department of Agriculture.

Career
In 1901 Laby obtained a position of junior demonstrator in chemistry at the University of Sydney. He took evening classes at the University and soon had two papers published by the Royal Society of New South Wales: 'The separation of iron from nickel and cobalt' in 1903 and 'Preliminary observations on radio-activity and the occurrence of radium in Australian minerals' with Sir Douglas Mawson in 1904.

In 1905 Laby went to England to study under Sir J. J. Thomson at the Cavendish Laboratory, University of Cambridge. There he received a Bachelor of Arts degree by theses on the ionization produced by alpha-particles and on the supersaturation and nuclear condensation of organic vapours. He also met Ernest Rutherford there, who became a friend.

Laby was appointed to the new chair of physics at Victoria University College in Wellington, New Zealand in 1909 and completed work with George Kaye resulting in publication of Tables of physical and chemical constants with some mathematical functions (London, 1911); the title has had sixteen editions as of 2007. Laby was president of section A of the Australasian Association for the Advancement of Science in Melbourne, 1912.

Laby had married in 1914 and the next year was appointed to the chair of natural philosophy at the University of Melbourne. He developed valves for an anti-gas respirator, performed radiographic testing of fuses and inspected X-ray equipment for military hospitals.

Laby was awarded a Doctor of Science by the University of Cambridge in 1921 and carried on his research, mainly into heat and X-ray spectroscopy. He was Commonwealth adviser in Radium at the Commonwealth Radium Laboratory when it was established in 1929 on university grounds. In 1927 he joined the Council for Scientific and Industrial Research's Australian Radio Research Board.

In 1924 Laby was president of the Royal Society of Victoria, in 1931 he became a Fellow of the Royal Society, in 1939 was inaugural president of the Australian Institute of Physics and chairman of the Optical Munitions Panel 1940-44.

Late life
Laby had suffered from low blood pressure and asthma, he died on 21 June 1946 of arteriosclerosis. He was survived by his wife and two daughters.

Honours
In 1976 he was honoured on a postage stamp bearing his portrait issued by Australia Post .

See also
 French Australian

References

Further reading
Laby, Thomas Howell (1880 - 1946) Bright Sparcs biographical entry
Cecily Close, 'Laby, Thomas Howell (1880 - 1946)', Australian Dictionary of Biography, Volume 9, MUP, 1983, pp 640–641.
J. C. Beaglehole, Victoria University College (Wellington, 1949); D. P. Mellor, The Role of Science and Industry (Canberra, 1958); G. Currie and J. Graham, The Origins of CSIRO (Melbourne, 1966); W. F. Evans, History of the Radio Research Board, 1926-1945 (Melb., 1973); J. F. Richardson, The Australian Radiation Laboratory (Canb., 1981); Australian Cancer Conference, Report, 1930–37; Australian Physicist, 17 (Dec 1980); Historical Studies, 20 (Apr 1983); Records of the Australian Academy of Science, 3 (Mar 1975), no. 1
Thomas Howell Laby a Bright Sparcs exhibition
 Tables of physical and chemical constants and some mathematical functions (1921 edition) digitized copy
 Tables of physical and chemical constants and some mathematical functions (1911 edition) digitized copy

External links
 

1880 births
1946 deaths
Australian physicists
Fellows of the Royal Society
People from Creswick, Victoria